Eufradis Rodriguez, (born October 28, 1992), better known by his stage name Euro, is a Dominican-American rapper signed to Young Money Entertainment, and was born in the Dominican Republic. Lil Wayne announced that he is the new member of Young Money on his Dedication 5 mixtape. He then appeared on the second Young Money compilation album, Young Money: Rise of an Empire, on three songs, including the first single "We Alright". Euro released a mixtape called July, on July 31, 2014. It was a preview for his debut studio album, Don't Expect Nothing, which had many delays. Don't Expect Nothing was finally released on September 20, 2019.

Musical career

2013–present: Early life and career beginnings
Euro developed his rapping talents by getting into Christian rap at the early age of 7 in his father's church. Euro's stage name was inspired by the first two letters of his first name and last name (Eufradis Rodriguez).
Lil Wayne announced that Euro was the newest signee to Young Money Entertainment on his Dedication 5 mixtape. Euro featured on four songs on that mixtape in 2013, "Ain't Worried", "Cream", "Fuckin' Problems", and "Live Life". Lil Wayne has said that it was his "straight-to-the-point lyrical style" that first attracted him to Euro. He then appeared on the second Young Money compilation album, Young Money: Rise of an Empire, on three songs, the first single "We Alright", "Bang", and a solo track "Induction Speech".
In 2014 Euro attended a street heat production free-styling back and forth with Cory Gunz, showing off his extensive rap skills. Euro Released a freestyle over Rico Richie's "Poppin" beat produced by 808 Mafia.

Euro announced that he will be releasing his debut mixtape, Don't Expect Nothing, with a release date during 2014.
 On July 31, 2014, Euro released a seven track mixtape named July as a preview for Don't Expect Nothing, which was released on September 20, 2019.

Discography

Compilation albums

Mixtapes

Singles

As featured artist

Guest appearances

References

1992 births
Living people
American rappers of Dominican Republic descent
Young Money Entertainment artists
Cash Money Records artists
21st-century American rappers